Mahmudi-ye Bala (also Romanized as Maḩmūdī-ye Bālā; also known as Maḩmūdī) is a village in Qorqori Rural District, Qorqori District, Hirmand County, Sistan and Baluchestan Province, Iran. At the 2006 census, its population was 28, in 6 families.

References 

Populated places in Hirmand County